DCS are a British Asian live Bhangra band formed in 1983. They are seen as one of the first bands of the UK Bhangra scene along with other bands such as Alaap, Apna Sangeet, Heera, Shava Shava led by Nirmal Kumar Nirmal and many more.  As well as Bhangra, DCS also perform in Hindi and English.

Discography

"Teri Shaun" 1985 (Multitone Records)
"Au Nach Lao" 1986 (EMI)
"123 Go"   1986 (Mighty M Records)
"Bhangra's Gonna Get You" 1990 (Multitone Records)
"DCS O.U.1" 1992 (Multitone Records)
"Doin It" 1994 (Multi/BMG Records)
"Eat Ehythm" 1995 (Multi/BMG Records)
"be with me" 1995? mainstream single
"Punjabi Dance Nation" 1998 (Kamlee Records)
"Tenu Kaul Ke"
"Desi Culture Shock" 2007 (Kamlee Records)
"Oh Jaan Meri Yah" (featuring Juggy D)
"Rab Ne Banaiyan"
"Pilade Pilade"
"Bothle Sharab Diye"

Impact on Bhangra
DCS are seen as the predecessors to and have influenced modern day bands such as B21 and many more. Shin is seen as one of the most prominent Bhangra vocalists from England.

DCS are also one of the most respected bands in the industry due to their lack of variation between their recordings as opposed to other live bands and their live performances.

In 2005 DCS won "Best Group" at the UK Asian Music Awards. In 2008 Shin was awarded an "Outstanding Achievement" award at the UK Asian Music Awards for his work with DCS. In 2010 DCS won "Best Band" at the Brit Asia TV Music Awards.

See also
List of bhangra bands

References

Bhangra (music) musical groups
Bhangra (music)
Desi musicians
Musical groups established in 1983